Dear Friend (German: Liebe Freundin) is a 1949 Austrian drama film directed by Rudolf Steinboeck and starring Johannes Heesters, Vilma Degischer and Erik Frey.

The film's sets were designed by the art director Herbert Ploberger.

Cast
 Johannes Heesters as Adrian van der Steer 
 Vilma Degischer as Susanne Berger, Sekretärin 
 Erik Frey as Thomas Wolf, Verleger 
 Erni Mangold as Doris Thaller, Tochter 
 Teo Prokop as J.P. Thaller 
 Heribert Aichinger as Der Packer Franz 
 Karl Günther as Ein Strafverteidiger 
 Ludmilla Hell as Frau Pichler, Vermieterin 
 Peter Preses as Ein Anwalt 
 Gustav Waldau as Ein Landpfarrer 
 Irmtraut Jörg
 Gertrud Ramlo
 Evi Servaes
 Carlo Böhm
 Julius Brandt
 Hermann Glaser
 Peter Wehle

References

Bibliography 
 Fritsche, Maria. Homemade Men in Postwar Austrian Cinema: Nationhood, Genre and Masculinity. Berghahn Books, 2013.

External links 
 

1949 films
Austrian drama films
1949 drama films
1940s German-language films
Films directed by Rudolf Steinboeck
Austrian black-and-white films
Sascha-Film films